Middleton on the Wolds is a village and civil parish on the Yorkshire Wolds in the East Riding of Yorkshire, England. It is situated on the A614 road midway between Driffield and Market Weighton.

According to the 2011 UK census, Middleton on the Wolds parish had a population of 825, an increase on the 2001 UK census figure of 774.

History

Middleton on the Wolds was served by Middleton-on-the-Wolds railway station on the Selby to Driffield Line between 1890 and 1954.

The church dedicated to St Andrew was designated a Grade II* listed building in 1966 and is now recorded in the National Heritage List for England, maintained by Historic England.

Governance
The civil parish was in the East Yorkshire parliamentary constituency until the 2010 general election, when it was transferred to the constituency of Beverley and Holderness.

References

External links

Villages in the East Riding of Yorkshire
Civil parishes in the East Riding of Yorkshire